Mysterton is a suburb in the City of Townsville, Queensland, Australia. In the  Mysterton had a population of 809 people.

It is one of the smallest suburbs in Townsville.

Geography 
Mysterton  is predominantly residential, and is situated between the suburbs of Hermit Park, Mundingburra, Pimlico and Hyde Park.

History
Mysterton was named after the residence of Arminius Danner which during the 1880s was situated in the St Johns Wood Estate subdivision. During another subdivision in the 1920s, it was known as Mysterton Estate.

In the 2011 census, Mysterton had a population of 834 people.

In the  Mysterton had a population of 809 people.

Heritage listings
Mysterton has a number of heritage-listed sites, including:
 21 Lawson Street: Rosebank, home of Townsville pioneer, Andrew Ball

Education
There are no schools in Mysterton. The nearest government primary schools are Hermit Park State School in neighbouring Hyde Park to the north and Mundingburra State School in neighbouring Mundingburra to the south. The nearest government secondary school is Pimlico State High School in Gulliver to the west.

References

External links 

Suburbs of Townsville